Walter Edward Cox, known professionally as Bud Cort, is an American actor and comedian, known for his portrayals of Harold in Hal Ashby's film Harold and Maude (1971) and the eponymous hero in Robert Altman's film Brewster McCloud (1970).

He also voiced Toyman over the course of various series in the DC Animated Universe, including Superman: The Animated Series, Static Shock, and Justice League Unlimited.

Career
Cort was discovered in a revue by director Robert Altman, who subsequently cast him in two of his movies, M*A*S*H and Brewster McCloud. In the latter, he plays the title role. Cort went on to his best-known role as the suicide-obsessed Harold in Harold and Maude. Though it was not particularly successful on release, it gained international cult status and is now considered an American classic.

In 1979, Cort nearly died in a car accident on the Hollywood Freeway where he collided with an abandoned car blocking a lane into which he was turning. He broke an arm and a leg and sustained concussion and a fractured skull. His face was severely lacerated and his lower lip nearly severed. The accident resulted in plastic surgeries, substantial hospital bills, a lost court case, and the disruption of his career.

He has since appeared in a number of film, stage and TV roles: Endgame, Sledge Hammer!, The Chocolate War, The Big Empty, Theodore Rex, Dogma, But I'm A Cheerleader, Pollock, The Twilight Zone, The Secret Diary of Sigmund Freud and The Life Aquatic With Steve Zissou.

Cort's voice-over roles include Edgar the computer in the movie Electric Dreams; Toyman, a Superman villain, over the course of various DCAU series including Superman: The Animated Series, Static Shock, and Justice League Unlimited; and Josiah Wormwood in an episode of the earlier DCAU production Batman: The Animated Series. He can also be heard as The King in the English-language version of the feature film The Little Prince (2015), which premiered out of competition at the 2015 Cannes Film Festival and won the César Award for Best Animated Film in February 2016. It was made available to U.S. audiences through Netflix in 2016.

Cort made a guest appearance on the November 8, 2007 episode of Ugly Betty as the priest officiating at Wilhelmina Slater's ill-fated wedding. In 2010, he guest-starred on Criminal Minds in the episode "Mosley Lane", playing elderly pedophile Roger Roycewood who, along with his wife, kidnapped and killed young children. In 2012, he appeared as the artist "Gleeko" in the "Exit Wound the Gift Shop" episode of the second season of Eagleheart''.

Filmography

Film

Television

References

External links
 

Living people
1950 births
20th-century American male actors
21st-century American male actors
American male film actors
American male stage actors
American male voice actors
Film directors from New York (state)
Male actors from New York (state)
People from Rye, New York
Screenwriters from New York (state)
American male comedians